Leonid Vyacheslavovich Kuravlyov (8 October 1936 – 30 January 2022) was a Soviet and Russian film actor. He became a People's Artist of the RSFSR in 1976.

Early life
Kuravlyov was born in Moscow into a working-class family. His father Vyacheslav Yakovlevich Kuravlyov (1909–1979) worked as a locksmith at the Salyut Machine-Building Association and his mother Valentina Dmitriyevna Kuravlyova (1916–1993) was a hairdresser. In 1941 with the start of the Nazi invasion of the Soviet Union (known in Russia as the Great Patriotic War) his mother was arrested on false report, accused of counter-revolutionary activity (Article 58) and exiled to Karaganda, Kazakh SSR to work at the local plant. In five years she was freed without a right to live in Moscow and sent to Zasheyek, Murmansk Oblast in the Russian far north where she continued working as a hairdresser. In 1948 she managed to get a permission to see her son who spent a year with her at Zasheyek, and in 1951 she finally returned to Moscow.

Career
In 1955 Kuravlyov entered VGIK to study acting under Boris Bibikov. He graduated in 1960 and joined the Theater Studio of Film Actors. He made his first movie appearances while still a student. In 1960 he was noted by Vasily Shukshin and took part in his diploma film Reported From Lebyazhye. In 1961 they both starred in the popular melodrama When the Trees Were Tall, and in 1964 Shukshin gave him the leading role in his comedy movie There Is Such a Lad which brought Kuravlyov true fame and which he considered to be the start of his successful movie career. He also acted in Your Son and Brother (1965) and felt so grateful for what the director did for him that he later named his son after Shukshin.

The role of Shura Balaganov in Mikhail Schweitzer's comedy The Little Golden Calf based on the book by Ilf and Petrov was one of his first successful roles: he managed to create an image of a brash yet charming petty thief. His other notable roles of that period include Khoma Brut in one of the first Soviet horror movies Viy (1967), antagonist Sorokin in a psychological melodrama Not Under the Jurisdiction (1969), Robinson Crusoe in Stanislav Govorukhin's Life and Amazing Adventures of Robinson Crusoe (1972), a Nazi officer Kurt Eismann in Seventeen Moments of Spring (1973) and Lavr Mironovich in Pyotr Todorovsky's The Last Victim (1975).

In the 1970s he appeared in three to four films per year. Even though Kuravlyov was adept at playing serious dramatic roles, he is still best known for his leading roles in top-grossing comedy movies such as Afonya (1975) by Georgiy Daneliya (11th highest-grossing Soviet film, highest grossing film of the year, 62.2 mln viewers), Leonid Gaidai's Ivan Vasilievich: Back to the Future (1973, 17th highest-grossing film, 60 mln viewers) and It Can't Be! (1975, 46th highest-grossing film with 46.9 mln viewers), The Most Charming and Attractive (1985) by Gerald Bezhanov (the highest-grossing film of 1985, 44.9 mln viewers) and others.

According to Russian actress Lidiya Fedoseyeva-Shukshina, after being tipsy, Kuravlyov openly spoke about his negative attitude towards the leadership of the Soviet Union. She recalled that, drunk, he had opened the window at her house and had shouted to the whole street that he hated the Soviet regime. She had feared that "the police would come and take everyone away as rebels."

Later years
During the late 1990s he hosted a popular TV programme The World of Books with Leonid Kuravlyov where he talked about new book releases. In two years it was closed and then relaunched with new hosts. In 2012 he was awarded the IV class Order "For Merit to the Fatherland".

Kuravlyov was a devoted Christian, a member of the Russian Orthodox Church.

In 2014 Kuravlyov along with 100 other Russian members of culture signed an open letter in support of Vladimir Putin's position regarding Ukraine and Crimea. In his last years Kuravlyov lived in a nursing home where he was diagnosed with dementia. 

In January 2022, he was hospitalized with pneumonia. According to Kuravlyov's son, tests for COVID-19 were negative.

Death
Kuravlyov died from pneumonia on 30 January 2022, at the age of 85.

Selected filmography

 All that Jam (Весь этот джем, 2015) as Father Leonty
 The Book of Masters (Книга Мастеров, 2009)
 The Heirs (Наследники, 2008)
 Streets of Broken Lights (Улицы разбитых фонарей, 2005) as Ershov, police colonel
 Brigada (Бригада, 2002) as MVD general
 The Aristocratic Peasant Girl (Барышня-крестьянка, 1995) as Grigory Muromsky
 Shirli-Myrli (Ширли-мырли, 1995) as US Ambassador to Russia
 The Master and Margarita (Мастер и Маргарита, 1994) as Bosoy, chairman of housing association
 Weather Is Good on Deribasovskaya, It Rains Again on Brighton Beach (На Дерибасовской хорошая погода или на Брайтон-Бич опять идут дожди, 1992) as President of USSR Mikhail Gorbachev'
 Private Detective, or Operation Cooperation (Частный детектив, или Операция "Кооперация", 1989) as editor in chief
 Entrance to the Labyrinth (Вход в лабиринт, 1989) as Lev Khlebnikov
 Yolki-palki (Ёлки-палки!, 1988) as electrician
 The Left-Hander (Левша, 1987) as Emperor Alexander I Pavlovich
 The Twentieth Century Approaches (Двадцатый век начинается, 1986) as Von Bork
 The Most Charming and Attractive (Самая обаятельная и привлекательная, 1985) as Misha Dyatlov
 Dangerous for Your Life! (Опасно для жизни!, 1985) as Spartak Molodtsov
 TASS Is Authorized to Declare... (ТАСС уполномочен заявить..., 1984) as Zotov
 The Invisible Man (Человек-невидимка, 1984) as Thomas Marvel
 The Trust That Has Burst (Трест, который лопнул, 1984) as Farmer Ezra Plunkett
 Copper Angel (Медный ангел, 1984) as Larsen, professor
 We Are from Jazz (Мы из джаза, 1984) as Samsonov
 Look for a Woman (Ищите женщину, 1983) as Inspector Granden
 Vitya Glushakov - A Friend of the Apaches (Витя Глушаков — друг апачей, 1983)
 Simply Awful! (Просто ужас!, 1982) as Ruslan Ivanovich
 Ladies Invite Gentlemen (Дамы приглашают кавалеров, 1980)
 Borrowing Matchsticks (За спичками, 1980) as peasant
 The Meeting Place Cannot Be Changed (Место встречи изменить нельзя, 1979) as "Kopchyony", thief
 Little Tragedies (Маленькие трагедии, 1979) as Leporello, servant of Don Juan
 Tailcoat for Scapegrace (Фрак для шалопая, 1979) as police captain Deev
 Incognito from St. Petersburg (Инкогнито из Петербурга, 1977) as Shpekin, postmaster
 Mimino (Мимино, 1977) as Professor Khachikyan
 Timur and His Team (Тимур и его команда, 1976) as Georgiy Garaev, Timur's uncle
 You to Me, Me to You (Ты — мне, я — тебе, 1976) as Ivan Kashkin / Sergei Kashkin
 Afonya (Афоня, 1975) as Afanasy Borshchov
 The Flight of Mr. McKinley (Бегство мистера Мак-Кинли, 1975) as Mr. Droot
 It Can't Be! (Не может быть!, 1975) as Vladimir Zavitushkin
 Circus in the Circus (Соло для слона с оркестром, 1974) as Grísa
 Seventeen Moments of Spring (Семнадцать мгновений весны, 1973) as Kurt Eismann
 Ivan Vasilievich: Back to the Future (Иван Васильевич меняет профессию, 1973) as George Miloslavsky, burglar
 This Merry Planet (Эта весёлая планета, 1973) as Y
 Life and Amazing Adventures of Robinson Crusoe (Жизнь и удивительные приключения Робинзона Крузо, 1972) as Robinson Crusoe
 Two Days of Miracles (Два дня чудес, 1970) as Vadim Murashev
 Liberation (Освобождение, 1970) as Chuikov's signaler
 Shine, Shine, My Star (Гори, гори, моя звезда, 1970)
 The Beginning (Начало, 1970) as Arkady
 The Little Golden Calf (Золотой телёнок, 1968) as Shura Balaganov
 A Literature Lesson (Урок литературы, 1968)
 Time, Forward! (Время, вперед!, 1968) as Korneyev
 Viy (Вий, 1967) as Khoma Brutus
 Older Sister (Старшая сестра, 1966) as Volodya
 Your Son and Brother (Ваш сын и брат, 1965) as Stepan Voyevodin
 There Is Such a Lad (Живёт такой парень, 1964) as Pashka Kolokolnikov
 The Little Golden Calf as Shura Balaganov
 Michman Panin (Мичман Панин, 1960) as stoker Pyotr Kamushkin
 There Will Be No Leave Today (Сегодня увольнения не будет ... , 1959)

References

External links

 
 
   Leonid Kuravlyov biography, filmography, photogallery

1936 births
2022 deaths
20th-century Russian male actors
21st-century Russian male actors
Male actors from Moscow
People with dementia
Gerasimov Institute of Cinematography alumni
Honored Artists of the RSFSR
People's Artists of the RSFSR
Recipients of the Order "For Merit to the Fatherland", 4th class
Russian male film actors
Russian male voice actors
Russian television presenters
Soviet male film actors
Soviet male voice actors
Deaths from pneumonia in Russia
Burials in Troyekurovskoye Cemetery